A DC10 is a three-engine wide-body jet airliner manufactured by McDonnell Douglas.

DC10 or DC-10 may also refer to:

 DC-10 Air Tanker, a DC-10 modified for aerial firefighting
 DC10 (nightclub), a nightclub on the island of Ibiza
 "DC-10", a song by Audio Adrenaline from the album Audio Adrenaline, 1992

See also 
 McDonnell Douglas DC-X, a single-stage-to-orbit spacecraft.
 La Tante DC10 Restaurant, a restaurant in Accra, Ghana
 DCX (disambiguation)